The Simulation is the fifth studio album by American progressive metalcore band Born of Osiris, released on January 11, 2019 through Sumerian Records. It was originally announced as the first of two Born of Osiris albums planned for release in 2019, though the second album remained unreleased for the rest of that year. In July 2018, the ensemble released a lyric video for "Silence the Echo", the first single from the album. In November 2018 "The Accursed", the second single from the album, was released.  On January 10, 2019; the third single "Cycles of Tragedy" was released.

Track listing

Personnel 
 Ronnie Canizaro – lead vocals
 Lee McKinney – guitars
 Nick Rossi – bass
 Joe Buras – keyboards, synthesizers, backing vocals
 Cameron Losch – drums

References 

2019 albums
Born of Osiris albums
Sumerian Records albums